Adjustment may refer to:

Adjustment (law), with several meanings
Adjustment (psychology), the process of balancing conflicting needs
Adjustment of observations, in mathematics, a method of solving an overdetermined system of equations
Calibration, in metrology
Spinal adjustment, in chiropractic practice
In statistics, compensation for confounding variables

See also 
Setting (disambiguation)